Eileen O'Brien is a camogie player, winner of a Lynchpin award, predecessor of the All Star awards, in 2003 and short-listed for an award in 2004, 2007 and 2008. 
She won three All Ireland Club Championship medals with her club Granagh-Ballingarry GAA.

Early career
She won 16 All Ireland medals at different grades and was one of the most successful players in the history of the All Ireland second level schools championships, winning one junior, four senior and four seven-a-side colleges medals with St Mary's, Charleville. She scored 0-11 in the 1995 final when she was 14.

References

External links
 Profile in Cúl4kidz magazine

Living people
Year of birth missing (living people)
Limerick camogie players